

Asia

Australia

Canada

Ireland

The Netherlands

New Zealand

South Africa

United Kingdom

For blade colours of universities and university colleges, see university rowing.

United States

See also
Academic scarf

References

Blades – School and university